William George Gethin (4 May 1877 – 4 November 1939) was an English cricketer, who played a single first-class game for Worcestershire in 1921, when already aged 44. He scored 19 and 1, and held two catches.

Gethin had earlier played for Kidderminster Cricket Club in the Birmingham Premier League. In August 1900 he took 8/33 against West Bromwich Dartmouth.

His elder brother Stanley played four times for Worcestershire at the turn of the twentieth century.

Notes

References
 
 

1877 births
1939 deaths
English cricketers
Worcestershire cricketers
Sportspeople from Kidderminster